Sed Rahal is a town and commune in Djelfa Province, Algeria. According to the 1998 census, it had a population of 11,812. As of April 14, 2008, the population of Sed Rahal grew to 13,693 with the population being 46.5% female and 53.5% male.

References

Communes of Djelfa Province
Algeria